Eddie Little Sky (August 15, 1926 – September 5, 1997), also known as Edward Little, was an indigenous North American actor of the Oglala Lakota tribe. He had parts in 36 feature films and over 60 television shows, mainly westerns in the role of a Native American. He was one of the first Native American actors to play Native American roles such as his performance in the 1970 film A Man Called Horse.

Career
Little Sky was born as Edsel Wallace Little on the Pine Ridge Indian Reservation in Shannon County, South Dakota to Oglala Lakota parents Wallace Little, Sr. and Wileminna Colhoff. He attended the Holy Rosary Indian Mission school as a child. After leaving the United States Navy where he had served in the Pacific theater during World War II, he began working the rodeo circuit as a bull rider and bareback rider.

Following his work on the 1955 film Chief Crazy Horse, Audie Murphy encouraged Little Sky to become a professional actor; thus Little Sky, along with Jay Silverheels and Chief Dan George became one of the first Native Americans to play Native American roles in films. Hollywood normally used white actors wearing black wigs and dark make-up to play the parts of Native Americans. His first television role was in 1957 on the series Cheyenne in the episode titled The Iron Trail.

From that time onwards, Little Sky had numerous roles in many Western television series such as Gunsmoke, Bat Masterson, The Rifleman, The Virginian, The Men From Shiloh (rebranded name of The Virginian), Bonanza, Daniel Boone and The High Chaparral.

He also played in many films such as The Light in the Forest, Paint Your Wagon, Duel at Diablo, Breakheart Pass, and The Hallelujah Trail, but he is mainly remembered for his performance as Black Eagle in the 1970 film A Man Called Horse which starred Richard Harris. He was also technical adviser for Soldier Blue. He made several appearances as a Pacific native on Gilligan's Island.

Later years/marriage
Upon his retirement from the film industry in the late 1970s, he worked as director of the Oglala Lakota Tribal Parks and Recreation Authority. He married Dawn Gates, who became an actress known as Dawn Little Sky; the couple had five children.

Death
Eddie Little Sky died on September 5, 1997, aged 71 in Pennington County, South Dakota from lung cancer. He was interred at the Little's Flat Family cemetery in Oglala, South Dakota.

Filmography

References

1926 births
1997 deaths
20th-century American male actors
American male film actors
American male television actors
Male actors from South Dakota
Native American male actors
Oglala people
People from the Pine Ridge Indian Reservation, South Dakota
United States Navy sailors
United States Navy personnel of World War II
Deaths from lung cancer
Deaths from cancer in South Dakota